The 2010 Youngstown State Penguins football team represented Youngstown State University as a member of the Missouri Valley Football Conference (MVFC) during the 2010 NCAA Division I FCS football season. Led by first-year head coach Eric Wolford, the Penguins compiled an overall record of 3–8 with a mark of 1–7 in conference play, placing last out of nine teams in the MVFC. Youngstown State played their home games at Stambaugh Stadium in Youngstown, Ohio.

Schedule

References

Youngstown State
Youngstown State Penguins football seasons
Youngstown State Penguins football